Nikolai Bogduk  is a retired Australian anatomist, and emeritus professor of the University of Newcastle Bone & Joint Institute, Australia. His research and publications were primarily on the anatomical sources and causes of chronic spinal pain and headache, as well as the development of new diagnostic techniques and treatments for these conditions.

Publications

Books 

 Clinical and Radiological Anatomy of the Lumbar Spine. N Bogduk (Author), 5th ed., Churchill Livingstone. 2012. 
 Management of Acute and Chronic Neck Pain. N Bogduk, B McGuirk (Authors), 1st ed., Elsevier. 2006. 
 Biomechanics of Back Pain. M Adams, N Bogduk, K Burton, P Dolan (Authors), 3rd ed., Churchill Livingstone. 2012. 
 Medical Management of Acute and Chronic Low Back Pain. An Evidence-Based Approach. N Bogduk, B McGuirk (Authors), 1st ed., Elsevier. 2002. 
 Medical Management of Acute Lumbar Radicular Pain: An Evidence-Based Approach. N Bogduk, J Govind (Authors), 1st ed., Newcastle Bone and Joint Institute. 1999. 
 Medical Management of Acute Cervical Radicular Pain: An Evidence-Based Approach. N Bogduk (Author), 1st ed., Newcastle Bone and Joint Institute. 1999. 
He has also published over 100 chapters to books on spinal pain and headache.

Edited 
 Practice Guidelines for Spinal Diagnostic & Treatment Procedures. 2nd ed., Spine Intervention Society. 2014. 
 Encyclopedia of Pain. 2nd ed., Springer. 2013.  (section editor)
 Classification of Chronic Pain. N Bogduk, H Merskey (Editors), 2nd ed (revised), IASP. 1994, 2011, 2012. 
 Pain Medicine Journal, Interventional Pain & Spine Medicine Section (section editor).

Research papers 
Bogduk has published anatomical research, randomised controlled trials, observational studies, and reviews. The main themes of his published research were determining the innervation of the spinal column, examining the biomechanics of the spine, the development of diagnostic tests for neck and low back pain, and developing and looking at minimally invasive treatment techniques such as radiofrequency neurotomy.

Awards 
 Volvo Award for Back Pain Research (1987)
 Distinguished Member Award, Australian Pain Society, (2008)
 Member of the Order of Australia (2013) - For significant service to medical research and education, particularly in the specialties of anatomy, spinal health and chronic pain management.
 SIS Aprill Lifetime Achievement Award (2017)
 Research Prize of the Cervical Spine Research Society
 Award for Outstanding Research of the North American Spine Society
 Research Prize of the Spine Society of Australia, three times.
 Excellence in Teaching, University of Newcastle

The Spine Intervention society also present a grant called the "Nikolai Bogduk Young Investigator Grant."

References 

Australian anatomists
Australian medical doctors
Members of the Order of Australia
University of Newcastle (Australia) alumni
Living people
Year of birth missing (living people)